The Association of Government Accountants (AGA) is a professional organization for government financial management professionals. Its activities include work in government financial management across sectors and worldwide, working to increase government financial performance and accountability.  Based in Alexandria, Virginia, the AGA was founded in 1950 and currently has more than 14,000 members. In addition, the AGA grants the professional designation of Certified Government Financial Manager.

See also
 American Institute of Certified Public Accountants
 Certified Public Accountant
 List of post-nominal letters
 Professional certification

References

External links
CGFM Certification
CPA Exam Application Process

Accounting in the United States
Professional titles and certifications
Professional certification in finance